Carter Township is an inactive township in Carter County, in the U.S. state of Missouri.

Carter Township most likely took its name from Carter Creek.

References

Townships in Missouri
Townships in Carter County, Missouri